Hong Kong Air International Ltd was founded in the 1970s to provide helicopter services in Hong Kong, such as scheduled flights, tourist flights, and external load lifting.

History
The company was started by Maurice Holloway, as part of Hutchison (now Hutchison Whampoa), in 1971(?) and ceased trading in 1976.

Fleet
VR-HGL  Bell 212

VR-HGT Aérospatiale AS-350 Ecureuil

VR-HGX Aérospatiale Alouette II - as seen in the movie Cleopatra Jones and the Casino of Gold

VR-HGM  Bell Helicopters Bell 47

VR-HCK ? Aérospatiale Alouette 3

External links
Helicopter Postcards - HKA
Airliners.net photo of VR-HGM in Feb. 1974
Airline Codes - Callsigns
Heli Express website
Hutchinson-whampoa.com
Brian Tilbrook's website
Collector's Guide to Airline Timetables - HKA August 1973

Defunct airlines of Hong Kong
Airlines established in 1971
Airlines disestablished in 1976
Defunct helicopter airlines
1976 disestablishments in Hong Kong